Jilotepec is one of 125 municipalities in the State of Mexico.  The municipal seat is the city of Jilotepec de Molina Enríquez.

Regions of the State of Mexico